Mal is a masculine given name, often a short form (hypocorism) of Malcolm and other names. People so named include:

Mal
 Mal or Malhun Hatun (died 1323), wife of Osman I, founder of the dynasty that established and ruled the Ottoman Empire
 Mal mac Rochride, a 2nd-century Irish king
 Mal Hallett (1893-1952), American jazz violinist and bandleader
 Mal Moore (1939-2013), American college football player, coach and director of athletics
 Mal Peet (1947–2015), English author and illustrator best known for young-adult fiction
 Mal Young (born 1957), British television producer, script writer and executive producer 
 Mal Walden (born 1945), Australian former journalist and television news presenter
 Mal Webb (born 1966), Australian musician
 Mal Whitfield, American track athlete

Malcolm
 Mal Anderson (born 1935), Australian retired tennis player
 Mal Aspey (born 1947), English former rugby league footballer and coach
 Mal Atwell (born 1937), former Australian rules football player and coach
 Mal Brough (born 1961), Australian politician
 Mal Brown (born 1946), former controversial Australian rules football player and coach
 Mal Bryce (born 1943), former Deputy Premier of Western Australia
 Mal Cochrane (born 1961), Indigenous Australian former professional rugby league footballer
 Mal Davis (born 1956), Canadian National Hockey League former player
 Mal Eason (1879-1970), American Major League Baseball pitcher
 Mal Evans (1935–1976), roadie and friend of the Beatles
 Mal Graham (born 1945), American former National Basketball Association player
 Mal Hammack (1933-2004), American National Football League running back
 Malcolm Hancock (1936–1993), American magazine cartoonist
 Malcolm Kutner (1921-2005), American National Football League player
 Mal Meninga (born 1960), Australian rugby league coach and former player
 Mal Michael (born 1977), former Australian rules footballer from Papua New Guinea
 Malcolm St. Clair (filmmaker) (1897-1952), Hollywood film director, writer, producer and actor
 Malcolm Spence (Jamaican athlete) (born 1936-2017), Jamaican sprinter
 Mal Waldron (1925-2002), American jazz pianist, composer and arranger
 Mal Washer (born 1945), Australian politician

Malachy
 Mal Donaghy (born 1957), former footballer from Northern Ireland
 Mal Loye (born 1972), English cricketer

Other
 Malupo Kaufusi (born 1979), former rugby league footballer
 Maldwyn Mal Pope (born 1960), Welsh musician and composer
 MaliVai Washington (born 1969), American retired tennis player
 Malvin Mal Whitfield (born 1924-2015), American 400 and 800 metre runner and three time Olympic champion

English-language masculine given names
Masculine given names
Hypocorisms